Ironwood is a common name for a large number of woods that have a reputation for hardness. Usage of the name may (or may not) include the tree that yields this wood. There is a list of some of the species involved at the article. 

Ironwood may also refer to:

Places
 Ironwood, Michigan, a city in the Upper Peninsula of the U.S. state of Michigan
 Ironwood Township, Michigan, north of the city
 Ironwood High School in Glendale, Arizona
 Ironwood Ridge High School in Tucson, Arizona
 Ironwood Springs Christian Ranch, a Christian camp in Minnesota
 Ironwood State Prison

Mythology and folklore
 Ironwood (Norse mythology), a forest in Norse mythology

Other
 Ironwood (comics), a 1990s erotic comic series by Bill Willingham 
 Ironwood Pharmaceuticals, a drug manufacturer
 Catherine Yronwode, comic-book editor whose name is pronounced "Ironwood"

See also
 Ironbark, a common name of species that have dark, deeply furrowed bark
 Ironweed (disambiguation)